Zlatko "Čik" Čajkovski (24 November 1923 – 27 July 1998) was a Croatian and Yugoslavian football player and coach. His brother, Željko Čajkovski, was a footballer as well. Normally a defensive midfielder, Čajkovski was renowned for his tremendous physical condition and marking ability and is considered to be one of the finest Yugoslav footballers. Despite his normally defensive role he was also a fine passer and possessed top-class technical ability.

Playing career
On club level Čajkovski played initially for HAŠK. After World War II, he moved to the newly-established Partizan.

Partizan
Čajkovski was one of the star ("most eminent") players in first 10 years of club's history. He went on to win two Yugoslav league titles (1946/47, 1948/49) and three Yugoslav Cup (Marshal Tito Cup) trophies (1947, 1952, 1954).

Čajkovski amassed 391 appearances (156 in the league), scored 97 goals and wore the captain armband, in his closing years with Partizan.

"Čik" played as many as 80 international friendlies for the Belgrade side, including a highly rated South American tour in the winter of 1953/54.

FC Köln
After Partizan, Čajkovski found employment abroad. He first went to West Germany in 1955. He decided and signs for FC Köln, and for the next three seasons he played for this German club under the guidance of coach Hennes Weisweiler. Immediately in the first season, he played in 24 games and scored two goals. He played a total of 57 league games and scoring seven league goals during that time. He played three games in the German Cup and scored one goal.

Yugoslavia
Between 1946 and 1955 he played 55 times for the Yugoslav national team scoring seven goals. Participating at the Olympic Games 1948 and 1952, he won the silver medal on both occasions. The final of the 1952 tournament in Helsinki was lost against the then ascending Hungarian side of the Magic Magyars.

He also participated in the FIFA World Cups of 1950 and 1954. In 1950, Yugoslavia only lost to hosts Brazil in the group phase, during which Čajkovski scored two goals versus Mexico. In 1954, Yugoslavia drew in the group phase against Brazil, but were eliminated in the subsequent quarter final match against eventual tournament winners Germany. In 1953, Čajkovski was one of four Croatian players on the FIFA Select XI who played against England. His final international was a May 1955 friendly match against Scotland.

International goals

Style of play
Although Čajkovski played as a defensive midfielder, he was equally good in the offense and, due to his exceptional stamina and tenacity, he was able to cover virtually the entire field. His unusual zigzag dribbling technique made his moves difficult to predict for the opposing players. Čajkovski was also very skilled in heading the ball, despite his short stature.

Coaching career
Čajkovski acquired his coaching licence under Hennes Weisweiler at the German Sports Academy in Cologne. His first appointment were in Israel, Turkey and the Netherlands.

His first great success was the German Championship 1962 with 1. FC Köln. In 1963 he took over the reins at FC Bayern Munich, which he guided from the second division into the first division, two wins in the German Cup and the win in the European Cup Winners Cup final against Rangers FC from Glasgow in 1967. In this period he formed around the goalkeeper Sepp Maier, Franz Beckenbauer and, the later legendary, striker Gerd Müller, then all in their very early twenties, one of the top teams in Europe and the whole world.

Later, Čajkovski coached Hannover 96, 1. FC Nürnberg, Kickers Offenbach, which he took as a second division club to win the German Cup in 1970. After NK Dinamo Zagreb and 1. FC Nürnberg, he had another stint 1. FC Köln and also returned once more to Kickers Offenbach. Then he went to Greece in AEK Athens where he won the double. He then went to Switzerland to coach FC Zürich (1978–1980) and FC Grenchen (1980), having his final assignment with Grazer AK in 1981. After that, he coached AEK Athens (1982) and Apollon Kalamarias (1983–84).

Managerial statistics

Honours

Player
Partizan
Yugoslav First League: 1946–47, 1948–49
Yugoslav Cup: 1947, 1952, 1954,

Yugoslavia
Summer Olympics silver medal: 1948, 1952

Manager
Köln
German Championship: 1962
Oberliga: 1961–62, 1962–63

Bayern Munich
DFB-Pokal: 1965–66, 1966–67
European Cup Winners' Cup: 1966–67

Kickers Offenbach
Regionalliga: 1969–70

AEK Athens
Alpha Ethniki: 1977–78
Greek Cup: 1977–78

References

External links

 
 Serbian national football team website 

1923 births
1998 deaths
Footballers from Zagreb
Association football wing halves
Croatian footballers
Yugoslav footballers
Croatia international footballers
Yugoslavia international footballers
Dual internationalists (football)
Medalists at the 1948 Summer Olympics
Footballers at the 1948 Summer Olympics
Medalists at the 1952 Summer Olympics
Footballers at the 1952 Summer Olympics
Olympic medalists in football
Olympic footballers of Yugoslavia
Olympic silver medalists for Yugoslavia
1950 FIFA World Cup players
1954 FIFA World Cup players
HAŠK players
FK Partizan players
1. FC Köln players
Hapoel Haifa F.C. players
Yugoslav First League players
Oberliga (football) players
Liga Leumit players
Yugoslav expatriate footballers
Expatriate footballers in West Germany
Yugoslav expatriate sportspeople in West Germany
Expatriate footballers in Israel
Yugoslav expatriate sportspeople in Israel
Yugoslav football managers
1. FC Köln managers
FC Bayern Munich managers
Hannover 96 managers
Kickers Offenbach managers
GNK Dinamo Zagreb managers
1. FC Nürnberg managers
AEK Athens F.C. managers
FC Zürich managers
FC Grenchen managers
Grazer AK managers
Apollon Pontou FC managers
Bundesliga managers
Yugoslav expatriate football managers
Expatriate football managers in West Germany
Expatriate football managers in Greece
Yugoslav expatriate sportspeople in Greece
Expatriate football managers in Switzerland
Yugoslav expatriate sportspeople in Switzerland
Burials at Belgrade New Cemetery